The Bradlee-McIntyre House is a Victorian Cottage Style house. It is now located in Longwood, Florida at 130 West Warren Avenue, after being moved there from Altamonte Springs. On March 28, 1991, the house was added to the U.S. National Register of Historic Places.

The Bradlee-McIntyre House was built circa 1885 for noted Boston architect Nathaniel Jeremiah Bradlee and family. It is the only surviving "cottage" in Orange and Seminole counties, a Queen Anne Style three-story, 13-room winter vacation house featuring an octagonal tower and "ginger-bread" trim typical of the flamboyant houses of the Victorian Period.

Currently the Bradlee-McIntyre House is open to the public for tours on scheduled days as posted at the house.  Museum tours are offered the 2nd and 4th Wednesdays and Sundays from 1-4 pm.

References

External links
 Seminole County listings at National Register of Historic Places
 Florida's Office of Cultural and Historical Programs
 Seminole County listings
 Bradlee-McIntyre House
 Longwood Historical Trail at Historic Hiking Trails

Houses on the National Register of Historic Places in Florida
National Register of Historic Places in Seminole County, Florida
Houses in Seminole County, Florida
1880s establishments in Florida
Queen Anne architecture in Florida
Longwood, Florida